Electronic messaging may refer to:

One-to-one-communication
Instant message (on a computer network)
Personal message (on a computer network)
Text message (on a cellular phone network)
SMTP (on a computer network)
Email (on a computer Network)
Voicemail (using the PSTN)
Fax (using the PSTN)
Pager (using the PSTN)

One-to-many communication
Bulletin board system (on a computer network)
Internet forum (on a computer network)
Usenet newsgroup (on a computer network)